Abdelnasser El-Gohary, (born 1970, Dakahlia) is an Egyptian poet. So far, he has published more than fifteen collections of poetry and two plays of the long text. He received several awards, the most recent of which was the Classical Poetry Award from the Egyptian Writers Union in 2016. He is also a member of the Board of Directors of the Egyptian Writers Union in 2018/2020, hosted by the Sino-Arab Forum - the first session - Creativity on the New Silk Road in Cairo - 2018.

Career 
Abdelnasser Ahmed El-Gohary Mohamed was born in Dakahlia Governorate, Egypt on July 28, 1970. He studied at Mansoura University and obtained a Bachelor of Laws in 2017. He is a member of the General Syndicate of the Egyptian Writers Union, the Writers Association, a member of the Cairo Atelier, and the World Islamic Literature Association, and he is a central lecturer at the General Authority for Cultural Palaces in Egypt. The General Authority for Culture Palaces included it in the Dictionary of Writers in 2004, and it was among the poets who were included in the Directory of the Egyptian Writers Union in 2006, and it was also included in the Great Encyclopedia of Arab Poets in Morocco in 2016, from contemporary poets who were included in the Al-Babtain Dictionary of Contemporary Arab Poets in its third edition - The eighth volume in 2014 AD - Kuwait, and he has more than fifteen poetry collections, including the collection “A cry that does not dry up” issued by the Egyptian General Book Authority in 2015. Culture in 2003 and “In the Waq Waq” for the literature series of the masses.

El-Gohary participated in poetry competitions and won many prizes, including the Classical Poetry Prize in the East Delta Cultural Region Competition in Egypt in 2000, the Central Literary Prize for the General Authority for Cultural Palaces in Egypt in 2005, the Writers Association Prize in Cairo in 2005, and the Emirates Heritage Club Prize in 2003, The Fusha Poetry Award from the Egyptian Writers Union in 2016, and other awards. He was also chosen among the 35 best poets in the Arab world in the UAE “Prince of Poets” competition in 2008. In his poems, El-Gohary touches on many topics, including love and dreamy romance, such as his poem “A Rose as a Discourse”, and resistance poetry and inspiration for the inheritance, where he talks about the homeland and love The homeland is like his poem “Poetry is the Memory of Anger,” as well as about the issues and concerns of Arab poetry.

Literary works

Poems 
 Fossils may indicate you
 Poetry is the memory of anger
 Space of my canned space
 Scary fantasy what scares crows
 Reveal
 Love is before me
 I am the little sea poet
 What now do I call you
 Who are you wasting my sadness?
 Did the doves flock returned?
 Be afraid of the temptation of the tired
 If the eyes of the night fall asleep
 What is ours shall not be yours

Poetry collections

source:

Poetic plays 
 The sun is picking up its sleeves
 In the Waq Waq

Book in criticism 
 Pens flying in the sky of the homeland

Prizes 
 Standard Arabic Poetry Prize in the East Delta Cultural Competition, 2000
 Standard Arabic Poetry Prize in the Literary Competition of Al-Nasr Military Magazine, 2001
 Literary competition prize held by the General Administration of Women's Culture of the General Authority for Cultural Palaces in classical poetry, 2003
 Emirates Heritage Club Award, 2003
 Central Literary Award, Diwan Branch, Classical Poetry, General Authority for Cultural Palaces, 2005
 Prize of the Literary and Artistic Competition of the Dakahlia Culture Branch, Eloquent Poetry, 2005
 The prize for the cultural competition held by the General Administration of Social and Cultural Clubs in classical poetry, 2005
 Literary competition prize held by Saad Zagloul Cultural Center in the seventh session, 2006
 Literary Disciple Award, 2007
 Best 35 poets award in the Arab world, Prince of Poets competition, 2008
 Knight Poets Award, Poet Al-Rasoul Satellite Channel, UAE, 2010
 Standard Arabic Poetry Award from the Egyptian Writers Union, 2016

See also 

 Mohammad Najib Abdallah

References

External links 
 Abdelnasser Gohary's account on Facebook
 Abdelnasser Gohary's Poems at diwandb.com

Egyptian poets
Arabic-language poets
1970 births
Living people